The Girls' Doubles tournament of the 2012 Asian Junior Badminton Championships was held from July 3–7 in Gimcheon, South Korea. The gold medalist in the last edition were Suci Rizki Andini and Tiara Rosalia Nuraidah from Indonesia. Malaysian pair Chow Mei Kuan / Lee Meng Yean No. 3 seeded and unseeded players Chen Qingchen / He Jiaxin of China finished in the semifinals round, settle for the bronze medal. The top seeded Lee So-hee / Shin Seung-chan of South Korea emerged as the champion after beat Huang Yaqiong / Yu Xiaohan of China in the finals with the score 17–21, 21–15, 21–17.

Seeded

  Lee So-hee / Shin Seung-chan (champion)
  Shella Devi Aulia / Anggia Shitta Awanda (quarter-final)
  Chow Mei Kuan / Lee Meng Yean (semi-final)
  Wiranpatch Hongchookeat / Puttita Supajirakul (quarter-final)
  Narissapat Lam / Maetanee Phattanaphitoon (third round)
  Melati Daeva Oktaviani / Rosyita Eka Putri Sari (quarter-final)
  Le Thu Huyen / Pham Nhu Thao (second round)
  Cheung Ying Mei / Yuen Sin Ying (third round)

Draw

Finals

Top Half

Section 1

Section 2

Section 3

Section 4

Bottom Half

Section 5

Section 6

Section 7

Section 8

References

External links 
Main Draw

2012 Asian Junior Badminton Championships
Junior